Ireneusz Pacula (born 16 November 1966) is a Polish former ice hockey player and coach. He played for Naprzód Janów, ECD Sauerland, ESC Wolfsburg, Mannheimer ERC, EC Kassel, EV Ravensburg, GEC Nordhorn, and EHC Straubing during his career. He also played for the Polish national team at the 1988 Winter Olympics and the 1987 and 1992 World Championships.

References

External links
 

1966 births
Living people
Adler Mannheim players
ECD Sauderland players
Grizzlys Wolfsburg players
Ice hockey players at the 1988 Winter Olympics
Kassel Huskies players
Naprzód Janów players
Olympic ice hockey players of Poland
People from Mysłowice
Sportspeople from Silesian Voivodeship
Polish emigrants to Germany
Polish ice hockey coaches
Polish ice hockey forwards
Ravensburg Towerstars players
Straubing Tigers players